Richard Kairouz is an Australian former professional rugby league footballer who played for Manly Sea Eagles and Eastern Suburbs.

A winger, Kairouz started his career at Manly and broke into the first-grade side late in the 1993 NSWRL season, making two appearances off the bench. He moved to Eastern Suburbs in 1994 and played ten first-grade games that season, starting eight of them on the wing.

Kairouz is of Lebanese descent and represented Lebanon in the World Sevens competition.

References

External links
Richard Kairouz at Rugby League project

Year of birth missing (living people)
Living people
Australian rugby league players
Lebanese rugby league players
Australian people of Lebanese descent
Manly Warringah Sea Eagles players
Sydney Roosters players
Rugby league wingers